Głębock  is a village in the administrative district of Gmina Podgórzyn, within Jelenia Góra County, Lower Silesian Voivodeship, in south-western Poland. Prior to 1945 it was in Germany.

The village has an approximate population of 100.

Gallery

References

Villages in Karkonosze County